Nafpaktia, Latinized Naupactia, is the historical name for the region around the port town of Nafpaktos (Naupactus) in Central Greece.

It is also the name of a municipality in the Aetolia-Acarnania regional unit, West Greece region, Greece. The seat of the municipality is the town Nafpaktos. The municipality has an area of 876.209 km2.

Administration
The municipality Nafpaktia was formed at the 2011 local government reform by the merger of the following 6 former municipalities, that became municipal units:
Antirrio
Apodotia
Chalkeia
Naupactus
Platanos
Pyllini

Province
The province of Nafpaktia was one of the provinces of the Aetolia-Acarnania Prefecture. Its territory corresponded with that of the current municipality Nafpaktia. It was abolished in 2006.

Geography

Nafpaktia is one of the most popular mountainous areas in Greece for its scenery, and the availability of outdoor activities such as trekking, biking, horseback-riding, and archery.

Elatou is approximately one hour away from Nafpaktos and is built in a pine forest. This small, picturesque settlement is built amphitheatrically, while it only has a few permanent residents. Another popular village is Ano Chora. It used to be called Megali Lobotina, while it has a population of 30. It has narrow cobblestone paths and traditional houses, while there are many guesthouses, which are quite popular in the winter months. Katafygio is also one of the historical villages in mountainous Nafpaktia. Katafygio in the old days was named Amorani.

References

External links 

Nafpaktia and Nafpaktos
Nafpaktia
Katafygion Nafpaktias
Katafigio Nafpaktias(Mountainous Nafpaktia)
Paleopirgos (Mountainous Nafpaktia)

 
Municipalities of Western Greece
Provinces of Greece
Gulf of Corinth
Populated places in Aetolia-Acarnania